Felix Zwolanowski (12 July 1912 – 26 November 1998) was a German international footballer.

References

1912 births
1998 deaths
Association football forwards
German footballers
Germany international footballers
Fortuna Düsseldorf players